Andrew Droz Palermo,  is an American cinematographer, director, and screenwriter. He is known for his work on The Green Knight (2021), A Ghost Story (2017), You're Next (2011), A Teacher (2013), and for directing Rich Hill (2014) and One & Two (2015).

Personal life
Palermo was born in Columbia, Missouri, and was raised in Jefferson City, Missouri.

Career
Palermo frequently collaborates with director David Lowery, serving as the cinematographer on his films The Green Knight, A Ghost Story, and a television show Strange Angel. He also works with Hannah Fidell, shooting her films The Gathering Squall, Man & Gun, A Teacher, 6 Years, and The Long Dumb Road. He also served as the cinematographer on You're Next and V/H/S (also actor of role "Fifth Thug" in segment "Tape 56"), both directed by Adam Wingard.

In 2014, Palermo co-directed Rich Hill, a documentary that won the Documentary Grand Jury Prize at the 2014 Sundance Film Festival, a collaboration with his cousin Tracy Droz Tragos. Palermo also directed One & Two, starring Kiernan Shipka and Timothée Chalamet. It had its world premiere at the 2015 Berlin International Film Festival.

In 2023, Palermo became a member of the American Society of Cinematographers.

Filmography

References

External links
 

American cinematographers
American male screenwriters
American documentary filmmakers
Living people
People from Columbia, Missouri
People from Jefferson City, Missouri
Film directors from Missouri
Screenwriters from Missouri
Year of birth missing (living people)